Xenopholis werdingorum is a species of snake in the subfamily Dipsadinae of the family Colubridae. The species is endemic to South America.

Etymology
The specific name, werdingorum (genitive, plural), is in honor of the Werding family of Bolivia, on whose hacienda the holotype was collected.

Taxonomy
X. werdingorum is the most recently described (2009) of the three species in the genus Xenopholis.

Geographic range
X. werdingorum is found in Bolivia (Santa Cruz Department) and adjacent Brazil.

Description
Dorsally X. werdingorum is uniformly dark brown with an iridescent sheen. Ventrally, it is yellowish orange. The color transition on the flanks is gradual.

Reproduction
The mode of reproduction of X. werdingorum is unknown.

References

Further reading
Costa, Henrique Caldeira; Bérnils, Renato Silveira (2015). "Répteis brasileiros: lista de espécies 2015 ". Herpetologia Brasileira 4 (3): 75–93. (in Portuguese).
Jansen, Martin; Álvarez, Lucindo Gonzales; Köhler, Gunther (2009). "Description of a new species of Xenopholis (Serpentes: Colubridae) from the Cerrado of Bolivia, with comments on Xenopholis scalaris in Bolivia". Zootaxa 2222: 31–45. (Xenopholis werdingorum, new species). (in English, with an abstract in Spanish).
Powell, Randy L.; Eversole, Cord Blake; Crocker, Ashton V.; Lizarro, Dennis; Bravo, Reinaldo Cholima (2016). "Xenopholis werdingorum , Jansen, Álvarez & Köhler, 2009 (Squamata: Dipsadidae): range extension with comments on distribution". Check List 12 (5): 1–3.

Reptiles described in 2009
Colubrids
Snakes of South America